The Tripura Legislative Assembly is the unicameral legislature of the Indian state of Tripura.

The seat of the Legislative Assembly is at Agartala, the capital of the state. The term of the Legislative Assembly is five years, unless dissolved earlier. Presently, it comprises 60 members who are directly elected from single-seat constituencies.

History

Constituencies
Following is the list of the constituencies of the Tripura Legislative Assembly as of most recent delimitation of legislative assembly constituencies in 2008.

References

See also 
 Vidhan Sabha
 Tripura Legislative Assembly

 
Tripura
Constituencies
Constituencies
Constituencies